Louis Walker (born July 23, 1953) is an American football former linebacker who played in the National Football League for the Dallas Cowboys in 1974 for a total of 8 games.

References

Living people
1953 births
Dallas Cowboys players
American football linebackers
Colorado State Rams football players